Reawakening Pride Once Lost is the debut studio album by the Northern Irish Celtic metal band Waylander, released in 1998 by Century Media. The album was re-released in 2006 by the Irish label, Midhir Records. This pressing came with two bonus tracks - A Hero's Lament and Sunrise - both taken from the Dawning of a New Age demo.

Track listing

Band line-up
Ciaran O'Hagan - vocals
Dermot O'Hagan - guitars, backing vocals
Michael Proctor - bass
Den Ferran - drums, percussion, bodhrán, tambourine
Mairtin Mac Cormaic - tin whistle, bodhrán, backing vocals

Waylander (band) albums
Century Media Records albums
1998 debut albums